Khwetelhi Thopi  is an Indian professional footballer who plays as a winger for Kohima Eagles.

Career
Born in the Phek district in Nagaland, Thopi started playing football at the village and school level. In 2012, Thopi played for Life Sports in local tournaments and the Nagaland Premier League. After spending time with Life Sports, Thopi played for Kohima Komets and Veda in 2013. He also represented Nagaland in the Santosh Trophy three times. In 2014, Thopi signed with Shillong-based side Rangdajied United on a five-month contract. While playing for the club, Thopi also turned out for various local teams in Nagaland.

On 25 February 2016, it was announced that Thopi would move to newly promoted I-League side Aizawl on loan from Rangdajied United for the remainder of the 2015–16 season. Thopi made his professional debut in the Indian first division three days later on 28 February against Bengaluru FC. He came on as an 82nd-minute substitute as Aizawl lost the match 1–0.

On 22 August 2016, Thopi made his return to Rangdajied United by scoring a goal for the side as they were defeated by Shillong Lajong in the first match of the Shillong Premier League season 2–1.

After the Shillong Premier League season, Thopi returned to his native Nagaland and played for various clubs including Naga, Barak, Khriekesa, and Kohima Eagles.

Career statistics

References

Living people
Indian footballers
Rangdajied United F.C. players
Aizawl FC players
Association football forwards
Footballers from Nagaland
Nagaland Premier League players
Shillong Premier League players
I-League players
People from Phek district
Year of birth missing (living people)